Curtain Call is a 1940 comedy, directed by Frank Woodruff and starring Barbara Read, Helen Vinson, Alan Mowbray and Donald MacBride. The film was followed by a sequel, Footlight Fever, released in 1941.

Synopsis
Two theatrical producers plan to get even with a demanding actress by tricking her into starring in the worst play they can find. The producer and director conspire to give the actress a dreadful role to play from the script of "The End of Everything". The plot to mislead the actress, however, backfires when she loves the role and gives a stellar performance, which turns the play into a hit.

Cast
 Barbara Read as Helen Middleton
 Alan Mowbray as Donald Avery
 Helen Vinson as Charlotte Morley
 Donald MacBride as Geoffrey "Jeff" Crandall
 John Archer as Ted Palmer
 Leona Maricle as Miss "Smitty" Smith, Crandall's secretary
 Frank Faylen as Spike Malone
 Tom Kennedy as Massage Attendant
 Ralph Forbes as Leslie Barrivale
 J. M. Kerrigan as Mr. Middleton
 Ann Shoemaker as Mrs. Middleton
 Tommy Kelly as Fred "Freddy" Middleton

References

External links
 

1940 films
1940 romantic comedy films
American romantic comedy films
American black-and-white films
1940s English-language films
Films scored by Roy Webb
Films about actors
Films about theatre
RKO Pictures films
Films with screenplays by Dalton Trumbo
Films directed by Frank Woodruff
1940s American films